Sterling Sharpe (born April 6, 1965) is an American former professional football player who was a wide receiver for the Green Bay Packers of the National Football League (NFL). He played college football for the South Carolina Gamecocks, and played in the NFL from 1988 to 1994 with the Packers in a career shortened by a neck injury. He became an analyst for the NFL Network. He is the older brother of Pro Football Hall of Fame tight end Shannon Sharpe.

Early life and college
Sharpe was born in Chicago, USA, to Pete Sharpe and Mary Alice Dixon. Growing up, Sharpe lived in Glennville, Georgia, with his grandparents and siblings, including his younger brother, Hall of Fame tight end Shannon Sharpe. He graduated Glennville High School, playing running back, quarterback and linebacker and was a member of the basketball and track teams. As a wide receiver at the University of South Carolina, Sharpe set school records with 169 career receptions and 2,497 receiving yards and a since-broken record of 17 career touchdowns. He also set the school record for single-season receiving touchdowns with 11, which was broken in 2005 by Sidney Rice. Sharpe's No. 2 jersey was retired by South Carolina at the end of the 1987 regular season, making him the second Gamecock to be granted this honor while still playing. His college coach and mentor, William "Tank" Black, left the Gamecocks to become a player-manager and represented Sharpe throughout his professional career. Sharpe was inducted into the College Football Hall of Fame in 2014.

Professional career

Sharpe was the first round, seventh overall, draft pick by the Packers in 1988 and had an immediate impact on the team. In his rookie season, he started all sixteen games and caught 55 passes. His sophomore season he led the league with 90 receptions, the first Packer to do so since Don Hutson in 1945, and broke Hutson's records for receptions and receiving yards in a season. Sharpe was known as a tough receiver with strong hands, who was willing to go over the middle to make difficult catches in traffic.

A few years later, in 1992, Sharpe and the new quarterback, Brett Favre, teamed up to become one of the top passing tandems in the league. In the final game of that season, Sterling and Favre hooked up for Sharpe's 107th reception of the season which broke the NFL's single-season receptions record, set by Art Monk in 1984.  That season, he became one of only seven players in NFL history to win the outright "Triple Crown" at the receiver position: leading the league in receiving yards, receiving touchdowns, and receptions. Ray Flaherty (1932), Don Hutson (1936, 1941–44), Elroy Hirsch (1951), and Raymond Berry (1959) achieved this in the years before the Super Bowl era. The only other players to accomplish this feat are Jerry Rice (1990), Steve Smith Sr. (2005) and Cooper Kupp (2021).

In the 1993 season he broke his own record, with 112 receptions, which also made him the first player to have consecutive seasons catching more than 100 passes.  In 1994, his 18 touchdown receptions were the second-most in league history at the time, behind Jerry Rice's 22 in 1987. On October 24, 1993, he became the second Packer in team history to catch four touchdown passes in one game since Don Hutson in 1945.

Sharpe's tenure at wide receiver was cut short by a neck injury,  ending a career in which he was invited to the Pro Bowl five times (1989, 1990, 1992, 1993, and 1994). Since he was unable to continue playing and was not on the Packers team that won the Super Bowl in 1996, his younger brother Shannon gave him the first of the three Super Bowl rings he won, citing him as a major influence in his life by saying: 

In the span of his seven seasons in the League, he was second in receptions and receiving yards along with being third in touchdowns (with Jerry Rice being ahead of him in each category). His brother Shannon stated during his Hall of Fame ceremony that "I am the only person in the Hall of Fame that can say I was the second best player in my own family."

After his retirement from the NFL, Sharpe became an analyst for the NFL Network.

NFL career statistics

References

External links
 
 

1965 births
Living people
American football wide receivers
College football announcers
Green Bay Packers players
National Football League announcers
South Carolina Gamecocks football players
College Football Hall of Fame inductees
National Conference Pro Bowl players
Players of American football from Chicago
People from Glennville, Georgia
Players of American football from Georgia (U.S. state)
African-American players of American football
21st-century African-American people
20th-century African-American sportspeople